Aeneas Coffey (1780–1839) was an Irish inventor and distiller.

Biography
Coffey was born in 1780. According to some sources he was born in Ireland most likely in Co. Dublin or Co. Wicklow. Some references refer to his birth in Calais, France, in 1780 to Irish parents. Coffey was educated at Trinity College Dublin and entered the excise service around 1799–1800 as a gauger. He married Susanna Logie in 1808, and they had three sons over the next eight years: Aeneas, William and Philip.

Customs and excise officer

Coffey was appointed sub-commissioner of Inland Excise and Taxes for the district of Drogheda in 1813. He was appointed Surveyor of Excise for Clonmel and Wicklow in 1815. In 1816 he was promoted to the same post at Cork. By 1818 he was Acting Inspector General of Excise for the whole of Ireland and within two years was promoted to Inspector General of Excise in Dublin, Ireland.

He was a strong, determined upholder of the law, but aware of its shortcomings. He survived many nasty skirmishes with illegal distillers and smugglers, particularly in County Donegal in Ulster and in the west of Ireland, where moonshining was most rife. On several occasions he proposed to the government simple, pragmatic solutions to rules and regulations which had hampered legal distillers. Not all of his ideas were accepted. Between 1820 and 1824 he submitted reports and gave evidence to Parliamentary Commissions of Inquiry on many aspects of distilling, including formalising the different spellings of Irish whiskey and Scotch whisky. His 1822 report was solidly backed by the Irish distillers. He believed that viable legal distillation would discourage illegal practices.

He assisted the government in the drafting of the 1823 Excise Act which made it easier to distill legally. It sanctioned the distilling of whiskey in return for a licence fee of £10, and a set payment per gallon of proof spirit. It also provided for the appointment of a single Board of Excise, under Treasury control, for the whole of the United Kingdom, replacing the separate excise boards for England, Scotland and Ireland. The 1823 Excise Act also provided for not more than four assistant commissioners of excise to transact current business in Scotland and Ireland, under the control of the board in London.

Aeneas Coffey resigned from government excise service at his own request in 1824.

Inventor

Between his Dublin education and his work as an excise officer, Aeneas Coffey had ample opportunity to observe the design and workings of whiskey stills, as Ireland was the world's leading producer of whiskey in the 19th century, and Dublin was at the centre of that global industry. This was how Coffey became familiar with a design differing from the traditional copper pot alembic still commonly used in Ireland, the continuous, or column, still. First patented by a Cork County distillery in 1822, the column still remained a relatively inefficient piece of equipment, although it pointed the way towards a cheaper and more productive way to distill alcohol. It was that last point that captured Coffey's imagination. He made his own modifications to existing column still designs, so as to allow a greater portion of the vapours to re-circulate into the still instead of moving into the receiver with the spirit. The result was more efficient, producing a lighter spirit at higher alcohol content. Coffey patented his design in 1830, and it became the basis for every column still used ever since.

His column still became widely popular in Scotland and the rest of the world outside Ireland, where it is known as the "Coffey still" or "Patent Still". Early Coffey stills produced spirits of about 60% or somewhat higher alcohol by volume concentration but still offered its operators outstanding advantages; its fuel costs were low, its output high (2000 gallons a day of pure alcohol was a good average, it needed less maintenance and cleaning than pot stills and because the still was steam-heated, there was no risk whatsoever of scorching, saving labour costs and distillation down time. Modern versions of the Coffey still can achieve much higher alcohol concentrations, approaching 95.6% alcohol. As alcohol forms an azeotrope with water at this concentration, it is impossible to achieve higher purity alcohol in a single column. The Irish distilling industry generally did not take up the Coffey still, but big urban distilleries in Scotland took it on for scotch, and in England it was taken on by the gin distilleries.

Distiller

On his retirement from service, Aeneas Coffey went into the Irish distilling business. For a short time he ran the Dodder Bank Distillery, Dublin and Dock Distillery in Grand Canal Street, Dublin, before setting up on his own as Aeneas Coffey Whiskey Company in 1830. The development of the Coffey still made distillation of his own whiskey much more economical.

Later years

Nothing is known of the final years and last resting place of Aeneas Coffey. His eldest son, also called Aeneas Coffey, emigrated to South Africa and managed a distillery. Aeneas Coffey junior married but his wife died childless. He returned to England and spent his final years near London.

Legacy

Aeneas Coffey's invention changed the history of distilling. Automation of the distilling process enabled by him has been likened to the application of automation by Henry Ford in the automotive industry.

Mechanisation of alcohol production using his methods can now be found in almost every country on earth.

See also
 Ó Cobhthaigh – Gaelic-Irish surname now generally Anglicised as Coffey or Coffee
 List of inventions named after people
 List of alumni of the University of Dublin

References

18th-century Irish people
19th-century Irish people
1780 births
1852 deaths
Irish engineers
Irish inventors
People from Calais
Businesspeople from County Dublin
19th-century Irish businesspeople